The private security industry in South Africa is an industry providing guarding, monitoring, armed reaction, escorting, investigating and other security-related services to private individuals and companies in the country. Over the years there has been tremendous growth in the private security industry, not only in South Africa, but also in the rest of the world. The private security industry in South Africa is among the largest in the world, with over 9,000 registered companies, 450,000 registered active private security guards and a further 1.5 million qualified (but inactive) guards; many times more than the available personnel of the South African Police Service and South African Army, combined Studies have shown that South Africa had 2.57 private security personnel for every police employee. This is attributed by some to the country's relatively high levels of crime to a lack of public funds from Parliament towards the South African Police Service (SAPS) or to an increasing trend in many countries towards government outsourcing of certain security functions. Others have suggested the number of high-wealth individuals in South Africa in comparison with the rest of Africa has led to the growth of the industry.

Regulation 
The private security industry in South Africa is regulated by the Private Security Industry Regulatory Authority, based in Centurion, Gauteng. The authority was established by the Private Security Industry Regulation Act, 2001 and commenced operations in 2002. The authority has wide-ranging powers relating to the operation of private security companies in South Africa. Private security companies are required by law to be registered with the authority.

2006 private security strikes 

In 2006, private security personnel went on strike across South Africa. The strike lasted 96 days and cost the industry more than a million working days. The strike was supported by the South African Transport and Allied Workers Union and 15 other trade unions. The striking workers looted and damaged property, and committed violent crimes.

Criticism 
The Southern African Catholic Bishops' Conference criticised the private security industry in a 2012 briefing paper. The paper argued that the prevalence of private security in South Africa "perpetuates fear". The paper also noted that the private security industry "only protects the select and privileged group that can afford to pay for security services" and "exacerbates the divide between the wealthy and the poor".

References 

Crime in South Africa
Law enforcement in South Africa
Private security industry